The 2017 Caribbean Cup qualification began in March 2016. The qualification competition determined which Caribbean national teams would play in the 2017 Caribbean Cup and the 2017 CONCACAF Gold Cup.

Participants
25 teams from the 31 CFU members entered the qualification tournament. Sint Maarten participated for the first time since 1997.

Draw
Twenty five nations were involved in the draw, which took place on 16 January 2016, 21:00 AST (UTC−4), at the Jolly Beach Resort & Spa resort in St. John's, Antigua and Barbuda. Four teams were given a bye due to their involvement in the 2018 FIFA World Cup qualification – CONCACAF Fourth Round.
The draw was conducted by Sonia Bien-Aime, Kirsy Rijo Charles Kullman, Chet Green and Lance Whittaker. The CFU used their own rankings to determine which teams would be given seeds based on their previous performances in the competition.

Match schedule

Notes
The second round was originally scheduled for 15–21 May 2016 which is not on the FIFA Calendar.
The fifth place play-off was originally scheduled for 9–15 November 2016. However, three third round matches were postponed to 9–13 November 2016 due to Hurricane Matthew-related reasons. The fifth place play-off was rescheduled to be 4–8 January 2017, and also played in a single venue in Trinidad and Tobago instead of each team hosting one match.

Format
In each three-team group, each team plays one home match against one opponent, and an away match against another opponent. If any team withdraws, the remaining two teams play each other, with one home match and one away match.

Should the score remain level after regular playing time, extra time will be played and should the score still be level after extra time has been played, a penalty shoot-out will take place to determine the match winners. This rule was introduced to reduce the chance of a team's fate being decided by a drawing of lots.

Tiebreakers
The teams are ranked according to points (3 points for a win in regulation, extra time or penalties, 0 points for a loss). If tied on points, tiebreakers are applied in the following order:
Goal difference;
Goals scored;
Away goals scored;
Drawing of lots.

First round
21 teams competed in the first round:
21 teams entered during this round.

Group 1

Group 2

Group 3

Group 4

Group 5

Group 6

Group 7

Qualified teams for second round
14 teams from the first round (seven group winners and seven group runners-up) qualified for the second round.

Group winners

Group runners-up

Second round
A total of 15 teams competed in the second round:
Saint Vincent and the Grenadines received a bye to this round.
14 teams qualified from the first round.

Group 1

Group 2

Group 3

Notes

Group 4

Notes

Group 5

Qualified teams for third round
9 teams from the second round (five group winners and best four group runners-up) qualified.

Group winners

Group runners-up

Third round
A total of 12 teams competed in the third round:
Haiti, Jamaica and Trinidad and Tobago received a bye to this round.
9 teams qualified from the second round.

Group 1

Notes

Group 2

Notes

Group 3

Group 4

Qualified teams for Caribbean Cup and CONCACAF Gold Cup
4 teams from the third round (four group winners) qualified for the 2017 Caribbean Cup and the 2017 CONCACAF Gold Cup.

Qualified teams for fifth place play-off
3 teams from the third round (best three group runners-up) qualified for the fifth place play-off.

There was confusion as to whether wins and goals scored in extra time count when comparing teams between different groups as laid out by the CFU regulations. Ultimately, they were counted and Haiti qualified to the fifth place play-off over Antigua and Barbuda.

Fifth place play-off
3 teams competed in the fifth place play-off:
3 teams qualified from the third round.
1 team from the fifth place play-off qualified for the CONCACAF Gold Cup CFU–UNCAF play-off.

Qualified team for CONCACAF Gold Cup CFU–UNCAF play-off
Haiti (fifth place play-off winner) qualified for the 2017 CONCACAF Gold Cup CFU–UNCAF play-off, but lost to Nicaragua and failed to qualify for the 2017 CONCACAF Gold Cup.

Goalscorers
7 goals

 Gino van Kessel
 Felitciano Zschusschen

5 goals

 Héctor Ramos

4 goals

 Leandro Bacuna
 Julian Wade
 Steeven Langil

3 goals

 Jonathan Faña
 Rhudy Evens
 Sloan Privat
 Shavon John-Brown
 Harry Panayiotou
 Mitchell Kisoor
 Kevin Molino
 Shahdon Winchester

2 goals

 Peter Byers
 Calaum Jahraldo-Martin
 Rangelo Janga
 Chad Bertrand
 Kelrick Walters
 Darly Batista
 Arnold Abelinti
 Ludovic Baal
 Roy Contout
 Jamal Charles
 Shane Rennie
 Anthony Abrams
 Marcel Barrington
 Trayon Bobb
 Adrian Butters
 Dwight Peters
 Ricky Shakes
 Kervens Belfort
 Andrew Jean-Baptiste
 Duckens Nazon
 Cory Burke
 Yoann Arquin
 Kévin Parsemain
 Juan Coca
 Olvin Ortiz
 Stefano Rijssel
 Ivanildo Rozenblad
 Trevor Wrensford

1 goal

 Dexter Blackstock
 AJ George
 Tevaughn Harriette
 Keiran Murtagh
 Josh Parker
 Stefan Smith
 Frederick Gomez
 Romario Harewood
 Reggie Lambe
 Tre Ming
 Jonte Smith
 Alberto Gómez
 Daniel Luis Sáez
 Gevaro Nepomuceno
 Rony Beard
 Edipo Rodríguez
 Alex Eric
 Kévin Rimane
 Moron Phillip
 Jake Rennie
 Kimo Sampson
 Elbert Anatol
 Claudio Beauvue
 Gilles Dan
 Livio Nabab
 Solomon Austin
 Brandon Beresford
 Neil Danns
 Sheldon Holder
 Kai McKenzie-Lyle
 Devon Millington
 Vurlon Mills
 Chris Nurse
 Gregory Richardson
 Jonel Désiré
 Wilde-Donald Guerrier
 Derrick Etienne
 Charles Hérold Jr.
 Mechack Jérôme
 Shaun Francis
 Je-Vaughn Watson
 Dicoy Williams
 Stéphane Abaul
 Johan Audel
 Jean-Sylvain Babin
 Mathias Coureur
 Jordy Delem
 Bruno Grougi
 Daniel Hérelle
 Antoine Jean-Baptiste
 Jorge Rivera
 Mike Ramos
 Javeim Blanchette
 Romaine Sawyers
 Myron Samuel
 Ramsleii Boelijn
 Dimitrie Apai
 Sergino Eduard
 Guno Kwasie
 Galgyto Talea
 Melvin Valies
 Cordell Cato
 Tyrone Charles
 Asanti Herring

Own goals

 Ryan Dicker (playing against Dominica)
 Malcolm Joseph (playing against Martinique)
 Rick de Punder (playing against Grenada)
 Gillermo Faerber (playing against Haiti)

References

External links
Caribbean Cup – Men, CONCACAF.com
Caribbean Cup, CFUfootball.org

2017 CONCACAF Gold Cup
2015–16 in Caribbean football
2016–17 in Caribbean football
Caribbean Cup qualification
Qualification